Vombisidris is a genus of subarboreal and arboreal ants in the subfamily Myrmicinae. Its species are known from India to Queensland, Australia. Like most other arboreal ants, their biology remains unknown.

Species

Vombisidris acherdos Bolton, 1991
Vombisidris australis (Wheeler, 1934)
Vombisidris bilongrudi (Taylor, 1989)
Vombisidris dryas Bolton, 1991
Vombisidris harpeza Bolton, 1991
Vombisidris humboldticola Zacharias & Rajan, 2004
Vombisidris jacobsoni (Forel, 1915)
Vombisidris lochme Bolton, 1991
Vombisidris nahet Bolton, 1991
Vombisidris occidua Bolton, 1991
Vombisidris philax Bolton, 1991
Vombisidris philippina Zettel & Sorger, 2010
Vombisidris regina Bolton, 1991
Vombisidris renateae (Taylor, 1989)
Vombisidris umbrabdomina Huang & Zhou, 2006
Vombisidris xylochos Bolton, 1991

References

External links

Myrmicinae
Ant genera
Hymenoptera of Asia
Hymenoptera of Australia